Folklore (stylized in all lowercase) is the eighth studio album by American singer-songwriter Taylor Swift. It was a surprise album, released on July 24, 2020, via Republic Records. After the outbreak of the COVID-19 pandemic in early 2020, Swift cancelled the concert tour for her seventh studio album Lover (2019). She conceived Folklore during quarantine as "a collection of songs and stories that flowed like a stream of consciousness", working with producers Aaron Dessner and Jack Antonoff virtually; her vocals were recorded at an inbuilt studio in her Los Angeles home, while Dessner and Antonoff operated from Hudson Valley and New York City, respectively.

Departing from the mainly upbeat pop production of its predecessors, Folklore consists of mellow ballads driven by neo-classical instruments, pursuing indie folk, alternative rock, and electroacoustic styles. Influenced by loneliness during quarantine, Swift explores themes of escapism, empathy, nostalgia and romanticism in the album, using a set of characters, fictional narratives, and story arcs, in contrast to the autobiographical tone of her previous projects. The title was inspired by the lasting legacy of folk songs, whereas its visual aesthetic reflects cottagecore.

Upon release, Folklore broke the record for the biggest opening day on Spotify for an album by a female act. Three of its tracks reached the top 10 in eight countries, namely "Cardigan", "The 1", and "Exile" featuring Bon Iver, the first of which is the album's lead single and marked Swift's sixth number-one song on the US Billboard Hot 100. Folklore topped the charts in various countries and is certified platinum in Australia, Denmark, New Zealand, Norway, the United Kingdom, and the United States. It was Swift's seventh number-one album on the US Billboard 200, where it reigned atop for eight weeks and became the best-selling album of 2020.

Folklore received widespread critical acclaim, centering on its emotional weight, poetic lyricism, and relaxed pace. Critics found its introspective essence timely for the pandemic and regarded its sound a bold reinvention of Swift's artistry. The album was featured on numerous 2020 year-end rankings, often referred to as the quintessential lockdown record. It won Album of the Year at the 63rd Annual Grammy Awards, making Swift the first woman in history to win the honor three times, following her wins for Fearless (2008) and 1989 (2014). She discussed Folklore and performed it live in the Disney+ concert documentary Folklore: The Long Pond Studio Sessions, premiering on November 25, 2020, and released Folklore sequel record, Evermore (2020), two weeks later. Several music artists cite Folklore as a source of inspiration.

Background 
In April 2020, Taylor Swift was set to embark on Lover Fest, her sixth concert tour in support of her seventh studio album Lover (2019), which was cancelled following the COVID-19 pandemic. On July 23, 2020, nine photos were uploaded to Swift's Instagram account, all without captions, forming a black and white image of the singer standing alone in a forest. Subsequently, she made another post across all her social media accounts, announcing that her eighth studio album would be released at midnight; Swift stated: "Most of the things I had planned this summer didn't end up happening, but there is something I hadn't planned on that DID happen. And that thing is my 8th studio album, Folklore". She confirmed the image as the album's cover artwork and revealed the track list. The Wall Street Journal opined that the surprise announcement "caught fans and the music business off-guard". Billboard stated that it "blindsided the pop music world", arriving as "exciting news" during lockdown. Folklore was released eleven months after Lover—the fastest turnaround for a Swift studio album at the time, beating the one year and nine months gap between Reputation (2017) and Lover. In another post, Swift announced that the music video for the track "Cardigan" would release at the same time as the album.

During the YouTube premiere countdown to the "Cardigan" music video, Swift hinted that the album lyrics contained many of her signature Easter eggs: "One thing I did purposely on this album was put the Easter eggs in the lyrics, more than just the videos. I created character arcs and recurring themes that map out who is singing about who... For example, there's a collection of three songs I refer to as the Teenage Love Triangle. These three songs explore a love triangle from all three people's perspectives at different times in their lives". She referred to the album as "wistful and full of escapism. Sad, beautiful, tragic. Like a photo album full of imagery, and all the stories behind that imagery", described "Cardigan" as a song that explores "lost romance and why young love is often fixed so permanently in our memories," and pointed-out the self-written track, "My Tears Ricochet", as the first song she wrote for the album. Uproxx narrated, "on Thursday night, that hand-drawn 'T' and 'S' could be seen up and down the timeline. Music fans and critics across genres unveiled hot takes, quoted lyrics like Myspace teens writing on the back of textbooks or crafting the perfect AIM away message, and debated Folklore's place in the unimpeachable Taylor Swift canon."

Conception 
Swift did not expect to create an album in early 2020. After the cancellation of Lover Fest, Swift quarantined herself, during which she watched numerous films, such as Rear Window (1954), L.A. Confidential (1997), Pan's Labyrinth (2006), Jane Eyre (2011), Marriage Story (2019), and The Last Dance (2020), and read more books than she ever did, books that "dealt with times past, a world that doesn't exist anymore", such as Rebecca (1938) by Daphne du Maurier. The fictions inspired Swift to venture beyond her usual autobiographical style of songwriting, and experiment with different narrative standpoints. In isolation during the lockdown, she let her imagination "run wild", ensuing in a set of imageries and visuals that consequently became Folklore.

Some of the imageries the singer developed include: "An exiled man walking the bluffs of a land that isn't his own, wondering how it all went so terribly, terribly wrong. An embittered tormentor showing up at the funeral of his fallen object of obsession. A seventeen-year-old standing on a porch, learning to apologize. Lovestruck kids wandering up and down the evergreen High Line. My grandfather, Dean, landing at Guadalcanal in 1942. A misfit widow getting gleeful revenge on the town that cast her out". Swift "poured all of [her] whims, dreams, fears, and musings" into the songs, and reached out to her "musical heroes" to collaborate with. She initially planned to release Folklore in early 2021, but it "ended up being done" sooner, and released in July 2020 without giving it second thoughts. She approached the album's creation without subjecting herself to any rules, and explained that she "used to put all these parameters on [herself], like, "How will this song sound in a stadium? How will this song sound on radio?" If you take away all the parameters, what do you make? And I guess the answer is Folklore."

Writing and recording 
Swift's songwriting drifted towards escapism and romanticism for Folklore. She enlisted two producers to achieve her desired sound—her longtime collaborator Jack Antonoff, who worked with her on 1989 (2014), Reputation, and Lover, and first-time collaborator Aaron Dessner, guitarist of American indie rock band the National. Due to COVID-19 concerns, Swift, Antonoff and Dessner quarantined remotely, separate from each other, creating Folklore by continually exchanging digital files of instrumentals and vocals. The album ensued from a DIY process, mixed and engineered by personnel scattered across the US.

Swift had previously met the National on a Saturday Night Live episode in 2014, and attended one of their concerts in 2019, where she talked to Dessner and his twin brother Bryce. She asked Aaron Dessner about his songwriting technique, because it is her "favorite thing to ask people who I'm a fan of", and he replied his band members live in different parts of the world, and that he would make instrumental tracks and send them to the lead singer, Matt Berninger, who would write the lyrics—this ignited Swift's idea to create music in quarantine.

Due to the pandemic, all recording studios were closed, so Swift built a home studio at her Los Angeles residence, named Kitty Committee, with help from engineer Laura Sisk. Antonoff, with whom Swift worked on five songs from the album, operated from New York City while Sisk recorded Swift's vocals in Los Angeles. "My Tears Ricochet" was the first song written for Folklore. Swift wrote it about her ties with Scott Borchetta, founder of her old record label, coming to an abrupt end. Antonoff compared the writing process of "Mirrorball" and "August" to that of "Out of the Woods" (2016). Swift wrote "Mirrorball" following the cancellation of Lover Fest, as an ode to fans who find solace in her music and concerts. She wrote "August" about a fictitious mistress, and "This Is Me Trying" based on multiple narratives, such as dealing with addiction, and her own mental health in 2016–2017 when she felt she was "worth absolutely nothing."

In late April, Swift approached Dessner to co-write some songs remotely. He worked on eleven of the album's 16 tracks over the next few months. Dessner "thought it would take a while for song ideas to come" and "had no expectations as far as what we could accomplish remotely", but was surprised that "a few hours after sharing music, my phone lit up with a voice memo from Taylor of a fully written song—the momentum never really stopped." Swift and Dessner "were pretty much in touch daily for three or four months by text and phone calls." He would mail her folders of instrumentals, and she would write the "entire top line"—melody and lyrics, and "he wouldn't know what the song would be about, what it was going to be called, where [she] was going to put the chorus." The first song the duo wrote was "Cardigan", which is based on one of Dessner's sketches called "Maple". "Cardigan" was followed by "Seven" and "Peace". Upon hearing the composition of "Peace", Swift felt an "immediate sense of serenity" that roused the feeling of being peaceful, but felt it would be "too on-the-nose" to sing about finding peace; she instead wrote about complex "conflicted" feelings contrasting the track's calming sound, and recorded it in one vocal take.A few weeks later, when Swift and Dessner had written "six or seven" songs, she explained him her concept of Folklore. She told him about the work she had done earlier with Antonoff, concluding that both of her works resonate as an album. Swift and Dessner also wrote "The Last Great American Dynasty", "Mad Woman", and "Epiphany", the first of which has an array of electric guitars inspired by Radiohead's 2007 surprise album In Rainbows. The lyrics document American socialite Rebekah Harkness, whom Swift had been wanting to write about ever since she bought the Holiday House in 2013. Dessner composed the piano melody for "Mad Woman" with his earlier work on "Cardigan" and "Seven" in mind. On "Epiphany", he slowed down and reversed the sounds of different instruments to create a "giant stack of harmony", and added piano for a cinematic trope. Swift wrote the song based on the experiences of her veteran grandfather, and healthcare workers in the pandemic.

Swift wrote two songs, "Exile" and "Betty", with her boyfriend, English actor Joe Alwyn. She developed "Exile" as a duet, and Dessner recorded a draft of her singing both the male and female parts. Swift and Dessner ran through candidates for the male partner, and Swift liked the voice of Bon Iver's Justin Vernon, who is one half of the American indie rock band Big Red Machine along with Dessner. Dessner sent the song to Vernon, who liked the song, added his own lyrics and sang his part. "Betty" is the only song on the album produced by both Dessner and Antonoff; Swift was influenced by Bob Dylan's The Freewheelin' Bob Dylan (1963) and John Wesley Harding (1967) for its composition. Alwyn used the pseudonym William Bowery for his credits. Upon the album's release, mainstream media and fans pointed out Bowery's lack of online presence, and presumed the use of a pseudonym for Alwyn. Swift later confirmed that Bowery is indeed Alwyn, and that he penned the chorus of "Betty", and the piano line and first verse in "Exile". The last two songs written were "The 1" and "Hoax", the first and last songs on the album respectively; Swift wrote both in a span of few hours. Speaking about his collaboration with her, Dessner commented "there's a palpable humanity and warmth and raw emotion in these songs that I hope you'll love and take comfort in as much as I do."

In a November 2020 Rolling Stone interview with Paul McCartney, Swift stated she began using words in the album's lyrics that she always wanted to use, not worrying about whether it would suit radio. She used "bigger, flowerier, prettier" words such as "epiphany", "elegies" and "divorcée", just because they "sound beautiful". Swift disclosed that she maintains lists of such words, and recalled using one such, "kaleidoscope", in "Welcome to New York" (2014). In a December 2020 Entertainment Weekly interview, Swift said the lyrics, melodies, and production of Folklore are the way she wanted them, without subjecting to others' expectations.

Folklore was written and recorded in secrecy. Swift, her boyfriend, family, management team, Antonoff, and Dessner were aware of the album's creation; she did not disclose the news or play the album to her friends like she did with her previous works. Near the end of Folklore's recording process, Dessner reached out to his regular collaborators, including the National bandmates, to provide instrumentation remotely. Bryce orchestrated several songs, while Bryan Devendorf performed the drums in "Seven". Dessner kept Swift's involvement confidential from his family and colleagues until announcement. While filming the "Cardigan" music video, Swift wore an earpiece and lip-synced to the song to prevent it from leaking. Dessner stated that Swift's label, Republic Records, was unaware of the album until hours before its launch.

Music and lyrics 

The standard edition of Folklore is about an hour and three minutes long, consisting of 16 tracks, while the deluxe edition adds a bonus song, "The Lakes", as the seventeenth track. Bon Iver is featured on "Exile", the fourth track. Folklore was written and produced by Swift, Dessner, Antonoff, and Alwyn, with additional writing credit to Vernon, the lead vocalist of Bon Iver, on "Exile". It is Swift's first album to carry an explicit content label.

Composition 
Critics mostly categorize Folklore as an alternative, indie folk, and electro-folk album departing from the pop maximalism and synth-driven sound of Swift's previous works. It also incorporates indie rock, electronica, dream pop, country, and folk rock elements. NME Hannah Mylrea wrote the album "dives headfirst into the world of folk, alternative rock and indie", while the same magazine's Gary Ryan classified it as indietronica and chamber pop. Kaelen Bell of Exclaim! said Folklore is a laid-back pop record, Variety Chris Willman and Pitchfork Jillian Mapes specified it as chamber pop, Michael Sumsion of PopMatters described it as a blend of chamber-pop and alt-folk, and Raisa Bruner of Time deemed it "alternative pop-folk". Music journalist Amanda Petrusich, reviewing for The New Yorker, felt Folklore is a "genre-less" record that drifts toward atmospheric pop rather than folk. In disagreement, The New York Times critic Jon Caramanica called it an atmospheric rock album abandoning pop. Spencer Kornhaber of The Atlantic said the album "swims through intricate classical and folk instrumentation" held together by electronic music.

Devoid of radio-friendly pop songs, Folklore eschews the mainstream sound of Swift's older works. It consists of mellow, cinematic, slow-paced ballads, with a minimal, lo-fi production, and elegant melodies, together lending a modern spin on traditional songwriting. It is built around neo-classical instrumentals, such as: soft, sparse and sonorous pianos, moody, picked and burbling guitars, glitchy and fractured electronic elements, subliminal, throbbing percussions, mellow programmed drums, Mellotron, sweeping orchestrations with ethereal strings and meditative horns. The album does not fully avoid plush synths and programmed beats characteristic of Swift's pop music, but instead dials them down to a subtle texture, delivering an electro-acoustic soundscape, which highlights Swift's voice and lyrics. Rolling Stone stated the album's tone resembles "Safe & Sound", Swift's 2012 single for The Hunger Games: Songs from District 12 and Beyond. The Ringer noted that Antonoff confers a synth-based style to the record, while Dessner contributes a piano-leaning sound, and linked Folklore to two songs on Lover—"The Archer" and "It's Nice to Have a Friend"—as Swift's albums "usually have a couple tracks that harken back to the previous album or wind up connecting them to the next".

Themes 
Folklore consists of songs exploring points of view that diverge from Swift's life, including third-person narratives written from perspectives of characters that interweave across the tracks. Its songwriting style combines balladeering with autobiographical experiences and character-driven storytelling, and is primarily distinguished by themes of wistfulness, escapism, nostalgia, contemplation, and empathy. Although Swift opted for a new sound, the album retains stylistic aspects of her trademark songwriting, such as mournful delivery and bildungsroman passion.

Compared to much of her older discography, Folklore reflected Swift's deepening self-awareness, introspection, and vivid storytelling that showed a higher degree of fictionalization and fewer self-references, culminating in an outward-looking approach. The lyricism is both personal and fictional, and a blend of both at times. The emotional and narrative range of Folklore is widened by expanding the focus from Swift's personal stories to imagined characters and personifications.

The narratives described in Folklore include a ghost finding its murderer at its funeral, a seven-year-old girl with a traumatized friend, an old widow spurned by her town, recovering alcoholics, and a love triangle between the fictional characters Betty, James, and an unnamed woman, as depicted in the tracks "Cardigan", "Betty" and "August", with each of the three songs written from each of the character's perspective in different times in their lives. NPR's Ann Powers defined Folklore as a "body constructed of memory, a shared sense of the world, built of myths, heard stories", based on the idea that "we each have our own folklore", with the album being Swift's folklore. Many songs on the album exude a cinematic quality in their lyrics, and reference objects and phenomena in nature, such as a solar eclipse, Saturn, auroras, purple-pink skies, salt air, weeds, and Wisteria.

Songs 
"The 1", the opening track, is a soft rock tune driven by a bouncy arrangement of piano, minimal percussion, and electronic accents. In the perspective of Swift's friend, "The 1" describes a new-found positive approach to life and past love, wishing they could have been soulmates. The slow-burning "Cardigan" is a folk ballad driven by moody, stripped-down instrumentals consisting of drums and tender piano; Swift sings from the perspective of a fictional character named Betty, who recalls the separation and enduring optimism of a relationship with a boy named James.

"The Last Great American Dynasty" is an alternative indie pop tune with classical instruments like slide guitar, viola, violins, drums and glitchy production elements. The satirical song tells the story of Harkness, the founder of Harkness Ballet, when she resided in Swift's Rhode Island mansion. It details how Harkness married into an upper-class family, was hated by the town, and blamed for the death of her then-husband and heir to Standard Oil, William Harkness, and the fall of his family's name, and draws parallels with Swift's life. "Exile" is a gospel-influenced, indie folk duet with Bon Iver, fusing Swift's soft vocals with Vernon's growling baritone, serving as an unspoken, argumentative conversation between two former lovers. It begins with a plodding piano and reaches a dramatic climax accompanied by strings, synths and harmonies.

Sung from the perspective of a deceased lover's ghost, "My Tears Ricochet" is an icy arena-goth song that reflects on the tensions following the end of a marital relationship, using funereal imagery—a metaphor for Scott Borchetta and his sale of the masters of Swift's older catalogue. It encompasses a music box, backing choir, reverbed ad-libs in the bridge, and reaches a tumultuous climax over shuddering drums. "Mirrorball" is a folk-tinged dream pop song, driven by pedal steel and twanging guitars. Its lyrics portray Swift as a disco ball, pertaining to the reflective quality, describing her ability to entertain people with her music by making herself her vulnerable and sensitive.

In "Seven", Swift sings in an innocent tone, reminiscing about an abused friend from her childhood in Pennsylvania, whom she cannot fully remember but still has fond memories of, over a resonant arrangement consisting of flurrying strings and piano. "August" is a gloomy dream-pop song that captures the summer affair between two young lovers—a naive girl who is seen holding on to a boy that "wasn't hers to lose"; the boy is revealed to be James, later in the album. The song depicts the girl grieve and yearn over her love, using Swift's light and breezy delivery, "yo-yoing" vocal yelps, and a grandiose production driven by acoustic guitar, glistening vocal reverb, and key changes.

The ninth track, "This Is Me Trying", is an orchestral pop song detailing the accountability and regret of an alcoholic who admits feeling inadequate. It contains Swift's "ghostly", reverberated vocals and a gradually growing, dense production. Over an acoustic arrangement of finger-plucked strings and soft horns, "Illicit Affairs" unfolds the infidelity of a disloyal narrator, and highlights the measures they carry out to keep the affair a secret. "Invisible String" is a folk song that provides a glimpse into Swift's love life with Alwyn, recounting the "invisible" connection between them that they were not aware of until they met, alluding to an East Asian folk myth called the Red Thread of Fate. It comprises an acoustic riff, thumping vocal backbeats, a distinct passive writing style, and references her older songs.

"Mad Woman" tackles the taboo linked with female anger, using sarcastic remarks at sexism, as Folklore moment of vituperation. It metaphorically describes Swift's dispute with Borchetta and Scooter Braun, painting the story of a deviant widow getting revenge, with references to witch hunts. "Epiphany" is an ambient hymn. It depicts the devastation of the pandemic, paying homage to healthcare workers, with whom she empathizes, comparing them to traumatized military soldiers, such as her veteran grandfather, Dean, who fought at the Battle of Guadalcanal (1942). The song is carried by a glacial piano, and a howling brass.

The fourteenth track, "Betty", is a country and folk rock song with prominent harmonica. It describes the relationship narrated in "Cardigan", but in the perspective of the cheating boyfriend James, who had a summer fling with the female narrator of "August". James apologizes for his past actions but does not fully own up to them, citing excuses. Its characters (Betty, James, and Inez) are named after the daughters of Blake Lively and Ryan Reynolds. The R&B-inclining "Peace" features jazzy vocals with a complex vocal melody. over a pulse juxtaposed with three lushly harmonized basslines, complemented by minimal synths and a drizzling piano. Lyrically, "Peace" is an ode to Swift's lover, dissects the effects of hectic stardom on her relationship and warns the subject of future challenges.

The standard edition of the album closes with "Hoax", a slow piano ballad with emotionally raw lyrics that detail a flawed but everlasting relationship, ending the album on a despondent note of sadness. The deluxe bonus track, "The Lakes", is a string-laden midtempo song that introspects on Swift's semi-retirement in England's Lake District; the location is also mentioned in "Invisible String". Imagining a red rose growing out of tundra "with no one around to tweet it", Swift fantasizes about a social-media-free utopia, referencing William Wordsworth, an English poet known for his Romantic writings.

Art direction 

Folklore album art, packaging, and lyric videos were created through a DIY approach. Swift collaborated with photographer Beth Garrabrant for the artworks, without a technical team due to COVID-19 concerns. The photoshoot marked a change from Swift's older shoots, where she would have "100 people on set, commanding alongside other people in a very committee fashion." She styled herself, including hair, makeup and wardrobe, and prescribed Garrabrant a specific moodboard. The photographs are characterized by a grayscale, black and white filter.

Cover artwork 
The standard cover art depicts Swift as an 18th-century pioneer sleepwalking in a nightgown. She is seen standing alone in a misty forest covered by morning fog, wearing a long, double-breasted plaid coat over a white prairie dress, gazing at the height of the trees. On the backside cover, she stands turned away from the camera, wearing a slouchy flannel-lined denim jacket slumped around her arms, and a white lace frock, with two loose braided buns low over her nape, similar to American Girl doll Kirsten Larson. The album title is written in an italicized roman font reminiscent of "a Chronicles of Narnia scrawl".

In December 2020, Jimmy Kimmel interviewed Swift about the presence of the word "Woodvale" on the cover of "Hide And Seek" edition of Folklore, which some suspected to be the title of a new album after Evermore; Swift denied it and said she did not reveal Folklore title to anyone until just before its release and used "Woodvale" as a code name, which was included in an artwork for reference, but was accidentally printed in the final products.

Aesthetic and fashion 
Reflecting its lyrical motifs of escapism, Folklore sees Swift embracing a rustic, nature-focused, cottagecore aesthetic for the project, moving away from the "technicolor carnival" of its predecessor, Lover. The music video for "Cardigan" expands on cottagecore, and starts with her sitting at a vintage piano in a cozy cabin in the woods. The video features a moss-covered forest and a waterfall-producing piano. Swift sold replicas of the "folklore cardigan"—a cream colored cable knit, with silver embroidered stars on the sleeves' chunky elbows, and navy blue piping and buttons—she wore in the video, on her website.

W regarded the cardigan the "pièce de résistance" of the aesthetic, and thought the eight cover artworks of Folklore have Swift "frolicking through the woods like a cottagecore queen". Irish Independent wrote that she became a "rural tunesmith communing with the birds and the trees", dressed up in a bulky "Clancy Brothers-style" Aran sweater. RTÉ thanked Swift for putting cardigans "back on the map once more". Noting that her album eras have been defined by their own color scheme, fashion and cultural motifs, Teen Vogue described Folklore as simple, neutral-toned wear, with the cardigan helping in understanding the sentimental role clothing plays. Cottagecore faced resurgence on the internet after Swift used the aesthetic, with a sales surge of hand-knitted Aran sweaters in Ireland and the US.

Comparing it with her past albums, The Guardian characterized 1989 as sleek and suave, Reputation as gothic and dangerous, and Lover as jovial and pastel-hued, whereas Folklore is the monochrome tale of a songwriter returning to folksy roots. Refinery29 dubbed the aesthetic as Swift's return to her "truest self", and compared her new look to that of a "classic English Rose". Vogue found Swift opting for a pastoral palette, and drew parallels to the music video of her 2012 single "Safe & Sound". Beats Per Minute deemed the aesthetic reminiscent of works by painters Grant Wood, Andrew Wyeth, and Lionel Walden, especially Wood's American Gothic. Vulture defined Folklore as "an eerie black-and-white indie period horror film" that pays homage to various cult classic films, especially A24 horror films, with its songs evoking cinematic visuals. The album's aesthetic has been compared to the visuals in multiple films, including Ivan's Childhood (1962), Picnic at Hanging Rock (1975), The Blair Witch Project (1999), Pan's Labyrinth (2006), The Babadook (2014), The Witch (2015), The Beguiled (2017), Woodshock (2017), The Lighthouse (2019), Midsommar (2019) and Little Women (2019).

Release and promotion 
Folklore was a surprise album. It marked the first time Swift abandoned her traditional album rollout, opting to release suddenly due to intuition; she stated "if you make something you love, you should just put it out into the world". She unveiled the album via her social media on July 23, 2020, 16 hours prior to its release to digital music platforms at midnight. Swift informed Republic Records about the new album only a few hours before its release, and thus it was not widely and immediately available at retail, especially in its first week. Deluxe CDs and vinyl LPs with seven other alternate covers, were sold on Swift's website exclusively. The standard edition "In the Trees" CDs of Folklore were released to retail on August 7, 2020, while "Meet Me Behind the Mall" CDs were made exclusive to Target. The formerly physical-exclusive Folklore deluxe, featuring the bonus track "The Lakes", was released to digital platforms on August 18, 2020.

Starting on August 20, 2020, a limited number of autographed Folklore CDs were delivered to various indie record shops in the US and Scotland to support small businesses in the pandemic. Swift mailed her Folklore cardigans to celebrity friends and well-wishers. Four six-song compilations of Folklore tracks were released to streaming, based on the thematic cohesion between them; The Escapism Chapter, The Sleepless Nights Chapter, The Saltbox House Chapter and The Yeah I Showed Up at Your Party Chapter were released in August–September 2020. Swift's ninth studio album, Evermore, is a sequel to Folklore. She dubbed them "sister albums".

Singles 

"Cardigan" serves as the lead single of Folklore. It was accompanied by a music video posted to YouTube, directed by Swift and produced by Jil Hardin. Both were released on July 24, 2020, alongside the album. It was serviced to US pop and adult pop radio formats on July 27. The song debuted at number one on the Billboard Hot 100 chart, becoming Swift's sixth chart-topper and second number-one debut. Billboard noted a unique radio roll-out for Folklore, where few of its tracks were simultaneously promoted to multiple radio formats. While "Cardigan" impacted pop and adult contemporary, "Exile" was sent to adult alternative radio on August 3, 2020, which had initially peaked at number six on the Hot 100, whereas "Betty" was sent to country radio on August 17, after arriving at number six on the Hot Country Songs chart. "The 1" was released as a promotional single in Germany on October 9, 2020; "The 1" had previously reached number four on the Hot 100. On July 24, 2021, the first anniversary of Folklore, the original orchestral version of "The Lakes" was also released as a promotional single.

Film and live album 

A concert documentary, titled Folklore: The Long Pond Studio Sessions, was released on November 25, 2020, to Disney+. It was directed and produced by Swift, seeing her perform all the tracks of Folklore in an intimate setting at Long Pong Studio, and sharing the stories behind the songs, with Antonoff and Dessner. Alongside the film's premiere, Swift's third live album, Folklore: The Long Pond Studio Sessions (From the Disney+ Special), containing the acoustic versions from the film, was released to streaming platforms.

Critical reception 

Folklore was met with widespread acclaim from music critics, who praised its emotional weight and introspective songwriting, calling it Swift's most subdued and sophisticated body of work yet. At Metacritic, which assigns a normalized rating out of 100 to reviews from professional publications, the album received an average score of 88, based on 27 reviews, indicating "universal acclaim". Folklore is widely regarded as Swift's best album and a pioneering album of 2020.

Rob Sheffield of Rolling Stone lauded Swift's songwriting abilities that brought out her "deepest wit, compassion, and empathy", making Folklore her most intimate album so far. Also noting the album's vivid storytelling filled with imagination and imagery, Pitchfork Jillian Mapes considered Folklore a mature step in Swift's artistry while retaining her core as a celebrated songwriter. Mark Savage of BBC classified Folklore as an indie record dealing with nostalgia and mistakes that resonate with the times. Katie Moulton from Consequence appreciated Swift's maturity, particularly the employment of third-person perspectives that had been uncommon on her previous works. Complimenting the album's writing, The Daily Telegraph's Neil McCormick, is Sarah Carson, and The Sydney Morning Heralds Giselle Au-Nhien Nguyen, gave the album full-score ratings. Describing Folklore as a bold attempt, Hannah Mylrea of NME praised Swift's ability to evoke vivid imagery, but said that the 16-song run can "sometimes drag slightly".

Several critics welcomed Swift's new musical direction. Chris Willman of Variety considered Folklore to be a "first-rank album", and its change of a musical style a "serious act of sonic palette cleansing" for Swift. Laura Snapes of The Guardian considered it to be the most cohesive and the most experimental among Swift's releases. Entertainment Weeklys Maura Johnston deemed the album a bold move for a pop star like Swift to challenge its audience. Roisin O'Connor of The Independent praised the album's "exquisite, piano-based poetry" which she found unconventional for Swift's catalog. AllMusic's Stephen Thomas Erlewine was positive towards the album but felt its musical styles are not "precisely new tricks" for Swift. In agreement, Annie Zaleski of The A.V. Club deemed the album not completely experimental, but still a new aspect of Swift's artistry. In his Substack-published Consumer Guide column, Robert Christgau was most moved by the youth-themed "Seven" and "Betty" than the more adult songs, which he summarized as "melodically fetching, lyrically deft pop songs that are fine as far as they go". He singled out "The Last Great American Dynasty" as the only intolerable song for how it reminds him of "Taylor Swift the showbiz plutocrat". In a mixed review, The New York Times critic Jon Caramanica praised Swift's songwriting but felt the album is burdened by "desolate" and "overcomposed" indie rock.

 Year-end lists 
A multitude of publications listed Folklore in their lists of best albums of 2020, including number-one placements from Billboard, Los Angeles Times, Rolling Stone, Insider, NJ.com, South China Morning Post, Uproxx, USA Today, Us Weekly, Variety, and Walla Walla Union-Bulletin. Folklore placed third on Metacritic's ranking of the most mentioned albums in 2020 year-end lists. Its tracks "The 1", "Cardigan", "The Last Great American Dynasty", "Exile", "Mirrorball", "Seven", "August", "This Is Me Trying", "Invisible String" and "Betty" were also named among the best songs of 2020.

 Commercial performance 
The biggest first day on Spotify for a 2020 album, Folklore opened with over 80.6 million  global streams on the platform, and earned the Guinness World Record for the most opening-day streams for an album by a female artist, surpassing Ariana Grande's Thank U, Next. "Cardigan" placed first on global Spotify chart with 7.742 million plays—the biggest first day for a song by a female artist in 2020. The album broke the Apple Music record for the most-streamed pop album in a day, and the Amazon Music indie/alternative record. Republic Records reported that Folklore sold over 1.3 million units worldwide on its first day and two million units in its first week. Swift was 2020's second most-streamed woman on Spotify, after Billie Eilish, and the year's most streamed act on Amazon Music. By the end of 2020, Folklore sold 2 million pure copies globally. The International Federation of the Phonographic Industry named it the year's best-selling album by a woman, and Swift the best-selling solo act of 2020.

 United States 
The album's on-demand first-day streams were 72 million in the US, beating Thank U, Nexts 55.9 million. Folklore sold over 500,000 units, including 400,000 sales, in its first three days, becoming the first album to do so since Swift's own Lover. Folklore debuted at number one on the Billboard 200 and topped it for eight weeks, becoming the longest-reigning number-one album of 2020. Opening with 846,000 units, consisting of 615,000 pure sales and 289.85 million streams, it marked the largest sales and streaming weeks of 2020, surpassing Juice Wrld's Legends Never Die. Its first-week sales alone were enough to make it the year's best-selling album, beating BTS' Map of the Soul: 7. Swift became the first woman with seven Billboard 200 number-one debuts and tied Janet Jackson for the third-most number-ones. Eclipsing Eminem, she was the first act in Nielsen SoundScan history to have seven albums each sell 500,000 copies or more in a week, and the first woman since Barbra Streisand to have six albums spend multiple weeks at number one. Folklore gave Swift her first entry on Alternative Albums, with the biggest debut ever on the chart.

It was 2020's fastest album to move a million units, the longest-running number-one album by a woman on the Billboard 200 since Reputation, and the first to spend its first four weeks at the top since Adele's 25 (2015); Swift became the first 21st-century act to have six albums each spend four weeks atop, and the first solo/female artist (after the Beatles) to have five albums each top the chart for six weeks or more. Billboard attributed the album's success to its timing, pandemic-suited songs and Swift's ability to connect with listeners. She also surpassed Whitney Houston as the woman with the most weeks atop Billboard 200 (47 weeks). Folklore sold a million pure copies in the US by October, becoming the only 2020 album to do so and Swift's ninth project to reach the mark. When Evermore topped the Billboard 200 later that year, Folklore rose to number three with 133,000 units, making Swift the first woman ever to chart two simultaneous albums in the top three.

All of its 16 tracks debuted simultaneously on the Billboard Hot 100, giving three top-10 and five top-20 entries. Swift became the first act to debut atop both Billboard 200 and Hot 100 in the same week, with the number-one debut of "Cardigan". She also was the first act to debut two songs in the top-four and three songs in the top-six simultaneously, as "The 1" entered at number four and "Exile" at number six. It increased Swift's sum of top-10 hits to 28, including 18 top-10 debuts. Folklore was her second consecutive album to chart all of its tracks together on the Hot 100 after Lover. Swift extended her record for the most concurrent Hot 100 debuts ever among women (16), and eclipsed Nicki Minaj as the woman with the most Hot 100 entries (113). 11 tracks charted on Hot Rock & Alternative Songs, of which a record eight entries were in the top 10.

On the 2020 Billboard Year-End charts, Swift was the top female artist for the fifth time in her career. Swift or Folklore ranked at number one on the year-end Top Album Sales, Tastemaker Albums, Alternative Albums, Hot Rock & Alternative Songs Artists, and Billboard 200 Female Artists charts. 11 tracks from Folklore landed on the year-end Hot Rock & Alternative Songs chart—the most for any act or album. Swift ranked as US Spotify's most streamed female artist of 2020, and the year's most consumed artist, totaling 3.5 million units (including 1.3 million sales). The best-selling album of 2020, Folklore earned 2.3 million units, including 1.276 million sales. It made Swift the first act to have the best-selling album of a calendar year five times, following Fearless (2009), 1989, Reputation, and Lover. Folklore was the eighth best-selling album of 2021 with 304,000 copies sold.

 Other markets 
Folklore opened at number-one on the Billboard Canadian Albums as Swift's seventh consecutive number-one, spending four weeks atop. All of its 16 tracks debuted on the Canadian Hot 100 chart together, with "Cardigan", "Exile", and "The 1" in the top-10. Folklore landed ninth on the 2020 Top Canadian Albums year-end list.

In the UK, Folklore debuted atop the Official Albums Chart with 37,000 copies, besting Eminem's Music to Be Murdered By for the biggest digital sales week of 2020. It became Swift's fifth consecutive chart-topper, making her one of the only five women to score five number-one albums in the UK, after Madonna, Kylie Minogue, Streisand, and Celine Dion, and the first one to do so in the 21st-century. Becoming Swift's first album to spend multiple weeks atop the chart, Folklore remained at number one for three consecutive weeks. On the UK Singles Chart, "Cardigan", "Exile", and "The 1" opened at numbers six, eight and 10, respectively, taking the total of Swift's UK top-ten entries to 16, and made her the first woman in UK history to concurrently debut three songs in the top-10. Folklore is the UK's most downloaded album of 2020. It further topped the Official Vinyl Albums Chart.

The album arrived at number one on the Irish Albums Chart, scoring Ireland's biggest opening week of 2020 and outperforming the rest of the top-five combined. Swift became the first solo female act with five Irish number-one albums in the 21st-century. Folklore stayed atop for four weeks, yielding Swift's longest-running Irish number-one album. The tracks "Exile", "Cardigan" and "The 1" appeared at the third, fourth and seventh spots on the Irish Singles Chart, respectively, taking Swift's career top-tens to a total of 15. Folklore is 2020's longest-running number-one album of Ireland, and the most downloaded. It reached number one in Belgium, Czech Republic, Denmark, Estonia, Finland, Greece, Norway, Switzerland, and many other European countries.

In China, the album sold more than 200,000 copies in its first six hours and around 740,000 copies in its first week, instantly becoming the best-selling and fastest-selling album of 2020 by a western act. Folklore was certified Diamond by QQ Music, making Swift the first western act to have four albums, with Reputation, 1989 and Lover, reach the milestone. It was the platform's most streamed English-language album of 2020. In Malaysia, Folklore spawned nine top-20 songs on the RIM Singles chart, with "Cardigan", "Exile", "The 1", "My Tears Ricochet" and "The Last Great American Dynasty" entering the top 10. In Singapore, 14 tracks from the album landed on the RIAS Singles chart, 11 of which reached the top 20 and five in the top 10. Folklore was the best selling foreign album of 2020 in Japan.

In Australia, Folklore topped the ARIA Albums Chart as Swift's sixth album to do so, giving her more chart-toppers in the country in 2010–2020 than any other artist. Its 16 tracks entered the top 50 of the ARIA Singles Chart together, breaking the all-time record for the most debuts in one week, previously held by Post Malone and Ed Sheeran. "Cardigan" became Swift's sixth number-one song, while "Exile", "The 1", "The Last Great American Dynasty" and "My Tears Ricochet" reached top-10; Swift became the act with the most Australian top-ten hits of 2020. Folklore topped the chart for four consecutive weeks as Swift's longest-running Australian number-one album since 1989, the only 2020 album to top the chart for more than two weeks, and the country's best selling album by a woman in 2020. It topped New Zealand's Official Top 40 Albums chart as well, spending two weeks atop. "Cardigan", "Exile", and "The 1" charted in the top-10 of the New Zealand singles chart, and "The Last Great American Dynasty" placed 13th. Folklore ranked at number seven on the RMNZ 2020 year-end albums list.

 Awards 
Folklore and its songs received five Grammy Award nominations at the 63rd ceremony, winning the Album of the Year. Swift became the first woman in history to win Album of the Year thrice, and the fourth artist overall, tied with Frank Sinatra, Stevie Wonder and Paul Simon. The album was also a candidate for Best Pop Vocal Album, while "Cardigan" was nominated for Best Pop Solo Performance and Song of the Year, making Swift the most nominated female artist ever in the latter category with five nods. "Exile" contended for Best Pop Duo/Group Performance. At the 2020 American Music Awards, Swift scored four nominations: Artist of the Year, Favorite Pop/Rock Female Artist, Favorite Music Video for "Cardigan" and Favorite Pop/Rock Album for Folklore, and won the first three, extending her record as the most awarded artist in the show's history with 32 American Music Awards. It also marked the third consecutive year Swift was crowned the Artist of the Year, and sixth overall—the first and only artist to achieve it.

 Legacy 
Folklore release ignited widespread interest in the term "folklore" on the internet. In response to this mainstream attention, the American Folklore Society launched a website titled "What is Folklore?" and engaged in an online campaign to educate passersby about folklore studies. Folklorists were recruited to promote the academic field to the general public via social media. Metacritic's traffic skyrocketed by roughly half a million views upon Folklore release. The site's founder Marc Doyle stated, "There's nothing quite like Taylor Swift", whose albums supply "a great deal of traffic and user participation" to the site whenever they are released.

The album has been contextualized as a lockdown project by commentators, and earned a reputation as the archetypal quarantine album. The Guardian opined that Folklore was a respite from chaotic events. The Daily Telegraph called it "an exquisite, empathetic lockdown triumph". NME wrote the album will be remembered as "the quintessential lockdown album" that "felt like the perfect accompaniment for the weird loneliness" of 2020. Insider stated that Folklore would be known as "lockdown's one true masterpiece". Rolling Stone said the album may go down in history as "the definitive quarantine album" for providing comfort and catharsis "just when we needed it most". Billboard proclaimed that Folklore would be cherished as one of Swift's most influential albums. Uproxx noted how Folklore changed the tone of music in 2020, and its impact on the year's cultural landscape "can't be measured".

In a list awarding the most creative works that shaped quarantine, Vulture labeled Folklore as 2020's "Best Breakdown in Musical Form" for addressing loneliness and related thoughts. Vogue listed the album amongst the best moments of lockdown culture. The Week called it "the first great pandemic art" for setting "a high bar" for future pandemic-inspired projects. Financial Times called it "the first great lockdown album", while Hot Press termed it "the first great album of the lockdown era". Judging from its acclaim and commercial success, Tom Hull concluded that Swift "caught the spirit of the times" with Folklore.  Billboard named Folklore and Evermore as the best examples of innovative albums from artists who amended their creative process during the pandemic, and in a list titled "The 25 Musical Moments That Defined the First Quarter of the 2020s", called the album a "commercial smash" and "Grammy darling" that stands as "one of the quintessential quarantine full-lengths".

The making of and rave reception to Folklore encouraged Swift to release Evermore. Swift herself has credited Folklore for ushering a new mindset of songwriting in her repertoire, which in turn influenced her subsequent releases. Folklore was the most popular album of 2020 on Genius, and Swift was the top searched act. She was also the world's highest-paid solo musician of 2020, and the highest paid in the US, solely due to her incomes from the 2020 albums.

 Contemporaries 
Hayley Williams of Paramore described her second solo studio album, Flowers for Vases / Descansos, as her Folklore. Phoebe Bridgers suggested that her next record could be inspired by Folklore. Critics have noted influences of Folklore in Olivia Rodrigo's debut album, Sour (2021), and its lead single "Drivers License". Spanish singer-songwriter Zahara released a song titled "Taylor" in tribute to Swift, and credited Folklore for encouraging her to compose music again following months of isolation. Croatian singer Mia Dimšić named Folklore as an inspiration for "Guilty Pleasure", her song representing Croatia at the Eurovision Song Contest 2022. Christina Perri and Sabrina Carpenter credited Folklore with encouraging them to be emotionally honest in their songs without worrying about external expectations. Japanese-British singer-songwriter Rina Sawayama cited the poetic and fictitious traits of Folklore as a source of inspiration for her second studio album, Hold the Girl (2022). Bridgerton writer Abby McDonald stated the track "Illicit Affairs" inspired writing the episode "An Unthinkable Fate" of the series' second season. American singer-songwriter and actress Maya Hawke was inspired by Folklore compositions for her second studio album, Moss (2022). After Folklore, artists such as Hawke, Gracie Abrams, Ed Sheeran, King Princess, and Girl in Red chose to collaborate with Dessner and record songs at his Long Pond Studio.

 Track listing 
Credits are adapted from the album's liner notes and Tidal.

 Notes 
 All track titles are stylized in all lowercase.
 William Bowery is Joe Alwyn.

 Personnel 
Credits are adapted from Pitchfork, Tidal, and the album's liner notes.

 Musicians 

 Taylor Swift – lead vocals, songwriting, production (5, 6, 8–10, 14, 17)
 Aaron Dessner –  production (1–4, 7, 11–16), songwriting (1–3, 7, 11–13, 15, 16), piano (1–4, 7, 11–16), acoustic guitar (1, 7, 11, 12, 16), electric guitar (1–4, 11–14, 16), drum programming (1–4, 7, 11, 12), Mellotron (1, 2, 11, 13, 15), OP-1 (1, 4, 16), synth bass (1, 16), percussion (2–4, 7, 11, 12, 14), bass (2, 3, 7, 11, 12, 14, 15), synthesizer (2–4, 7, 11–13, 15), slide guitar (3), keyboards (3), high string guitar (14), field recording (15), drone (15)
 Bryce Dessner – orchestration (1–4, 7, 11–13)
 Thomas Bartlett – synthesizer (1), OP-1 (1)
 Jason Treuting – percussion (1)
 Yuki Numata Resnick – viola (1, 2, 7, 11, 12), violin (1, 2, 7, 11, 12)
 Benjamin Lanz – modular synth (2)
 Dave Nelson – trombone (2, 13)
 James McAlister – drum programming (2, 11), beat programming (12), synthesizers (12), hand percussion (12), drums (12)
 Clarice Jensen – cello (2, 7, 11–13)
 Rob Moose – orchestration (3, 16), violin (3, 4, 16), viola (3, 4, 16)
 JT Bates – drums (3, 7, 13)
 Justin Vernon – lead vocals (4), songwriting (4), pulse (15)
 Joe Alwyn –  production (4, 5, 8–10, 14), songwriting (4, 14)
 Jack Antonoff –  production (5, 6, 8–10, 14, 17), songwriting (6, 8–10, 17), live drums (5, 6, 8–10, 14, 17), percussion (5, 6, 8–10, 14, 17), programming (5, 6, 8–10, 17), electric guitars (5, 6, 8–10, 14, 17), keyboards (5, 6, 8–10, 17), piano (5, 17), bass (5, 8–10, 14), background vocals (5, 6, 9, 10, 17), acoustic guitars (6, 8, 14), B3 (6, 14), organ (9), Mellotron (14)
 Evan Smith – saxophones (5, 8–10, 14, 17), keyboards (5, 8–10, 17), programming (5), flute (8, 17), electric guitar (8, 10), accordion (10), background vocals (10), clarinet (14, 17), bass (17)
 Bobby Hawk – strings (5, 8, 9, 17)
 Bryan Devendorf – drum programming (7)
 Jonathan Low – synth bass (8)
 Mikey Freedom Hart – pedal steel (10, 14), Mellotron (14), Wurlitzer (14), harpsichord (14), vibraphone (14), electric guitar (14)
 Kyle Resnick – trumpet (13)
 Josh Kaufman – harmonica (14), electric guitar (14), lap steel (14)Additional instrument recording'

 Kyle Resnick – viola (1, 2, 7, 11–13), violin (1, 2, 7, 11–13)
 Bella Blasko – modular synth (2)
 Lorenzo Wolff – strings (5, 9)
 Mike Williams – strings (8, 17)
 Jon Gautier – strings (8, 17)
 Benjamin Lanz – trombone (13)

Technical 

 Taylor Swift – executive producer
 Jonathan Low – recording (1–4, 7, 11–16), mixing (1–4, 7, 8, 11, 15–17)
 Aaron Dessner – recording (1–4, 7, 11–16), additional recording (2, 11)
 Laura Sisk – recording (5, 6, 8–10, 14, 17), vocal recording (1–3; Swift on 4; 13, 15, 16)
 Jack Antonoff – recording (5, 6, 8–10, 14, 17)
 Bella Blasko – additional recording (2)
 Justin Vernon – vocal recording (Bon Iver on 4)
 John Rooney – assistant engineering (5, 9, 14)
 Jon Sher – assistant engineering (5, 9)
 Şerban Ghenea – mixing (5, 6, 9, 10, 12–14)
 John Hanes – mix engineering (5, 6, 9, 10, 12–14)
 Randy Merrill – mastering

Design 

 Taylor Swift – wardrobe styling, hair and makeup, packaging creative and art direction
 Beth Garrabrant – photography
 13 Management – packaging design, project support and coordination
 Republic Records – project support and coordination

Charts

Weekly

Year-end

Certifications

Release history

See also 
 List of Billboard 200 number-one albums of 2020
 List of UK Albums Chart number ones of the 2020s
 List of UK Album Downloads Chart number ones of the 2020s
 List of number-one albums of 2020 (Canada)
 List of number-one albums of 2020 (Australia)
 List of number-one albums of 2020 (Ireland)
 List of number-one albums from the 2020s (New Zealand)
 List of number-one albums in Norway
 List of number-one albums of 2020 (Belgium)
 List of best-selling albums in China

Footnotes

References

External links 
 

2020 albums
Taylor Swift albums
Albums produced by Taylor Swift
Albums produced by Jack Antonoff
Albums produced by Aaron Dessner
Alternative rock albums by American artists
Chamber pop albums
Concept albums
Folktronica albums
Albums impacted by the COVID-19 pandemic
Indie folk albums by American artists
Indietronica albums by American artists
Republic Records albums
Surprise albums
Grammy Award for Album of the Year
Albums recorded at Electric Lady Studios